Lyman David Benson (1909–1993) was an American botanist and author of Taxon names.  He established roughly 500 names for cacti as well as 14 other taxon names.

Works 
 1957. Plant Classification. Ed. Heath, Boston. 688 pages.
 1969. The Cacti of Arizona. 3ª ed. U.Arizona, Tucson. 218 pages. ISBN 0-8165-0509-8
 1969. The Native Cacti of California. Ed. Stan. U, Stanford. 243 pages. ISBN 0-8047-0696-4
 1981. Trees and Shrubs of the Southwestern Deserts. Ed. Univ. of Arizona. ISBN 0-8165-0591-8
 1982. The Cacti of the United States and Canada. Stanford University Press. 1044 pages. ISBN 0-8047-0863-0

American botanists

1909 births
1993 deaths